Åse Maria Kleveland (born 18 March 1949) is a Norwegian singer, guitarist, politician and activist.

A well-known folk singer and traditional guitarist in Norway, she was appointed Minister of Culture in Norway in 1990, and held the position until 1996, representing the Labour Party under the Gro Harlem Brundtland administration. She was also president of the Swedish Film Institute from 1999 to 2006.

In June 2007 she became chairman of the board of Human-Etisk Forbund, the Norwegian humanist organization, a position she held until 2013.

Personal life
Kleveland was born in Stockholm, Sweden to Eva Hansson, a bookkeeper from Sweden, and Olaf Kleveland, a civil engineer from Norway who had fled to Sweden in 1943 because of the Nazi occupation and found refuge with relatives. In 1957 Kleveland and her family moved to Romerike, northeast of Oslo, where her father got a job working at the Institute for Atomic Energy.

In a 1977 interview she describes how her parents shared equally in the household chores and that she and her husband Svenolov Ehrén, a Swedish artist, did the same. She is currently married to film director and cinematographer Oddvar Bull Tuhus.

Kleveland is fluent in Norwegian, Swedish, Danish, English, French and Japanese. She studied law at the University of Oslo.

Musical career

As a singer she is famous for her very dark, soulful voice. She also plays the guitar and has composed songs in the singer-songwriter tradition. She was also part of the vispop group Ballade!.

She began playing classical guitar at eight; at 10 she debuted in a radio show. Her first bout as a vispop singer was on an Erik Bye show when she was 13, and she released her first album in 1965. With her second album in 1966 she was one of the pioneers ushering in the new vispop genre, a blend of traditional folk song and pop. This led to a series of engagements in Paris, and a period of commuting between these Paris performances and her secondary school in Lillestrøm, north of Oslo. At age 17 she conducted a major tour of Japan which included several TV shows and the release of four singles in Japanese. She released her final solo album in 1973 and has released 13 singles for the Scandinavian and German markets.

In 1966 she represented Norway in the Eurovision Song Contest with the entry "Intet er nytt under solen" (There's Nothing New Under The Sun), finishing in third place. She broke a tradition expected of female performers at the time in that she was the first woman to not wear a dress, choosing a pantsuit instead.

She had a long association with the Norwegian Association of Musicians, first holding the office of secretary from 1979 to 1983, then serving as their leader from 1983 to 1987. She was also the President of the Musicians' Union from 1983 to 1986 and their Vice-President from 1986 to 1987.

In 1986 she hosted the first Eurovision Song Contest to be held in Norway in Bergen following Bobbysocks' victory in 1985, having previously introduced the Norwegian entry on camera at the 1980 contest.

Books 

  (with facsimiles of Carl Michael Bellman's sheet music from first editions of the 1790 Fredmans epistlar and the 1791 Fredmans sånger)

See also
 List of Eurovision Song Contest presenters

References

External links

 
 

1949 births
Living people
Eurovision Song Contest entrants of 1966
Women guitarists
Ministers of Culture of Norway
Melodi Grand Prix contestants
Melodi Grand Prix winners
Eurovision Song Contest entrants for Norway
Norwegian women singers
Norwegian folk singers
Norwegian guitarists
Norwegian humanists
Norwegian singer-songwriters
Singers from Stockholm
Norwegian people of Swedish descent
University of Oslo alumni